Mississippi Highway 467 (MS 467) is a short  north-south highway located entirely in Hinds County in central Mississippi. It serves to connect the towns of Edwards  and Raymond.

Route description
MS 467 begins in the town of Raymond at an intersection with MS 18 and it heads west along Main Street through a business district, where it has an intersection with Hinds Boulevard as it passes by the Raymond Campus of Hinds Community College, before curving northward to travel straight through downtown, where it passes by the Hinds County Courthouse. The highway passes through neighborhoods for several blocks, where it has an intersection with Raymond-Bolton Road, before leaving Raymond and passing through rural woodlands for a couple miles, where it has an interchange with the Natchez Trace Parkway. MS 467 now travels northwest through a mix of farmland and woodlands for several miles to cross Bakers Creek to enter the Edwards city limits as Withers Street. It passes through neighborhoods before entering downtown, where it makes a left turn onto Utica Street. The highway re-enters neighborhoods for a few blocks before making a right turn onto Mount Moriah Road, which it follows for a couple of blocks before making a right turn onto Vicksburg Street (Old U.S. 80), which it follows back into downtown. MS 467 curves left onto Magnolia Street before curving right onto Jackson Street, which it follows to leave downtown and pass through some northern neighborhoods before coming to an end at an intersection with MS 22, not even a tenth of a mile from its interchange with I-20/US 80 (Exit 19).

The entire route of MS 467 is a rural two-lane highway.

History
MS 467 was signed into law back in 1949, with it being officially designated and signs installed in 1953.

Major intersections

References

External links

Transportation in Hinds County, Mississippi
467